The Bing Crosby Show is a 28-episode sitcom television program starring crooner, film star, iconic phenomenon, and businessman Bing Crosby and actress Beverly Garland as a married couple, Bing and Ellie Collins, rearing two teenaged daughters during the early 1960s. In the format, Crosby portrayed a former entertainer turned architectural designer with a penchant for singing, and each episode usually contained at least one song. Produced by Crosby's own company, affiliated with Desilu Studios and subsequently CBS Paramount Television, the series aired on ABC from September 14, 1964, to April 19, 1965. Rebroadcasts continued until June 14.
 
The roles of the daughters Janice and Joyce Collins were played by Carol Faylen and Diane Sherry, respectively. Top Warner Bros. character actor Frank McHugh appeared as Willie Walters, the Collins's live-in handyman. Pamela Austin appeared twice on the program, as Clarissa Roberts.

This was one of the few times Crosby portrayed a happily married man, having often portrayed bachelors, widowers, divorcees, or priests. (Note: The Star Maker was one film in which he was happily married. He also portrayed a married man in the films Dixie and Blue Skies but there were problems in the relationships.)
 
Guest stars included Herbert Anderson, Frankie Avalon, Jack Benny, Jimmy Boyd, Macdonald Carey, Vikki Carr, his son Gary Crosby, Dennis Day, Roger Ewing, Glenda Farrell, Joan Fontaine, Kathy Garver, George Gobel, Kathryn Grant (Crosby's second wife, also known as Kathryn Crosby), Pat Harrington, Jr., Phil Harris, Charles Lane, Nobu McCarthy, Gary Morton, Ken Murray, Lloyd Nolan, Ruth Roman, and James Shigeta.
 
The Bing Crosby Show, main sponsor was Ford Motor Company's Lincoln-Mercury division, other sponsors included Lever Brothers, Mennen, Pepto-Bismol and Gillette. It was aired at 9:30 pm. Eastern on Mondays. The series faced competition on CBS from the sitcom Many Happy Returns, and on NBC, Crosby faced the second half of the popular The Andy Williams Show, which alternated with a Jonathan Winters variety show, The Jonathan Winters Show.

Cast
Bing Crosby....Bing Collins
Beverly Garland....Ellie Collins
Carol Faylen....Janice Collins
Diane Sherry....Joyce Collins
Frank McHugh....Willie Walters

Episode list

References

External links 
 

American Broadcasting Company original programming
1964 American television series debuts
1965 American television series endings
1960s American sitcoms
Television series about families
Television series by CBS Studios
Black-and-white American television shows
English-language television shows
Bing Crosby